were a Japanese backing vocals group best known for their contributions to the Super Robot series and Toei's Super Sentai and Kamen Rider Series. The group was disbanded after 1990.

The Japanese word  means "a cricket."

External links
Fan site 

Anime musical groups
Musical groups established in 1972
Musical groups disestablished in 1990
1972 establishments in Japan
1990 disestablishments in Japan